Brian Poole (born 2 November 1941) is a singer and performer who was the lead singer of 1960s beat band the Tremeloes (1957–62) and then Brian Poole and the Tremeloes (1962–66). He was brought up in the East End of London and grew up in Barking, East London. Poole attended Park Modern Secondary School, Barking and Barking Abbey Grammar School.

Career

The Tremeloes 
Poole met Alan Blakley and Alan Howard, at Park Modern Secondary School, Barking. In 1956, heavily influenced by their interest in rock and roll music, they decided to form a band. The original line-up consisted of Poole (vocals, guitar), Blakley (guitar), Howard (bass) and Graham Scott (guitar). While still in their teens, the band members met and befriended Dave Munden, who shared a love and passion for rock n’ roll. A strong bond was formed, which saw Munden join the band on the drums in 1957. A swift change of tactics saw Blakley switch to guitar, which Poole relinquished to take the title of lead vocalist and thus front the band.
 
In the early years, the Tremeloes were inspired by Buddy Holly and the Crickets and mainly covered their songs. They quickly gained local fame by playing at small venues in the area; during that time, their singing style developed and flourished. With Poole's Holly-style glasses and the band's unique style of harmony, the Tremeloes soon developed a wide fan-base and following. This continued to grow until they became one of the top dance hall attractions across Great Britain. On New Year's Day in 1962, the Tremeloes auditioned for a record contract with Decca Records, along with another up-and-coming band, the Beatles. Their regular slot on BBC Radio and large following meant that the Tremeloes were an obvious choice, and they were signed by the record label. Upon signing with Decca, the company bosses insisted that the band be billed as 'Brian Poole and the Tremeloes', since this was the trend at the time.

The band quickly embraced their new name. Their diverse musical talents meant that as well as producing their own singles, they also performed as backing for other recording artists. Their first chart entry was "Twist and Shout" in June 1963 (a cover version of a song by the Isley Brothers that was also covered by the Beatles). "Twist and Shout" reached number four on the UK Singles Chart, selling over one million copies, and other chart hits were soon to follow. In September 1963, they released "Do You Love Me". It reached number one in the UK charts, famously knocking the Beatles’ second number one hit, "She Loves You", from the top slot. "Do You Love Me" remained at the top of the charts for three weeks. 'Brian Poole and the Tremeloes' continued to produce hits and thrive in the UK charts, with tracks such as "Candy Man" (which reached number six) and the popular ballad "Someone, Someone" (which reached number two).

In 1966, Poole left the Tremeloes to begin a solo career and pursue other opportunities, one of which included starting his own record label called Outlook Records. Other members of the band continued as the Tremeloes.

Family 
In 1968, he married Pamela Poole (née Rice). They have two daughters, Shelly McErlaine (née Poole) and Karen Etherington (née Poole), who were both in Alisha's Attic.

Discography

Solo singles

References

External links
 Official Brian Poole website

1941 births
Living people
English male singers
English pop rock singers
Beat musicians
People educated at Barking Abbey Grammar School
Singers from London